The World RX of Abu Dhabi is a rallycross event held in Abu Dhabi for the FIA World Rallycross Championship. The event made its début in the 2019 season, at the Yas Marina Circuit.

Past winners

References

Rallycross
Abu Dhabi